Sughra Sadiq gizi Baghirzada (born 10 February 1947) is an Azerbaijani artist, Honored Artist of the Azerbaijan (2008).

Biography 
Sughra Baghirzada was born on 10 February 1947, in the city of Baku. Since her childhood, she has shown interest in arts. Her first success was the song "Jujalarim" (My chickens), performed at the celebration of Azerbaijani culture festival in Moscow in 1959 on the stage of the Bolshoi Theatre. It was precisely in the performance of Sughra Baghirzada and the accompaniment of the Azerbaijan State Symphony Orchestra under the direction of maestro Niyazi that the song "Jujalarim" was included in the collection "The Best Children's Voices of the World".

At the age of 12, she was invited to the “Azerbaijanfilm” studio as a dubbing actress. While studying in 8th grade, she starred in the short film "Roads and Streets" directed by Zeynab Kazimova. In 1963, S. Baghirzada was invited to the leading role of Yeter in Agharza Guliyev's film "Ulduz", which became very popular in the mid-60s.

After graduating from the Engineering and Technology Department of the Azerbaijan Oil Academy in 1970, she returned to the “Azerbaijanfilm” as an engineer, while continuing her career as an actress.

Sughra Baghirzada is a member of the Union of Artists of Azerbaijan, the Union of Cinematographers of Azerbaijan and the Confederation of Cinematographers of the CIS and the Baltic States.

Since 2004, Sughra Baghirzada has also been a member of the World Flower Council. This council includes 27 countries. She is the first and only representative of not only Azerbaijan, but of the entire Turkic-speaking world in this council. She has over 200 works, which she has exhibited in Latvia, Russia, France, Malaysia, New Zealand, UK, Croatia, Japan and China.

Sughra Baghirzada is the author of the book "Floristry", which is the first book published in the Azerbaijani language about the floral design, classical and modern trends of floristry.

Honours and awards 
In 2008, by the decree of the President of Azerbaijan Sughra Baghirzada was awarded the title of "Honored Artist of Azerbaijan".

For her activities and contribution to world culture, Sughra Baghirzada was presented with many honorary awards and titles:
 "Honorary Doctor" (2015), "Gold Star" medal (2015) and "Person of Culture 2015 in the Turkic world" for her contribution to culture of the Turkic world and the development of the Azerbaijani-Turkish fraternal  relationships, awarded by the Turkish World Studies of International Academy of Sciences;
 diploma "Founder of a new professional direction in the floristry industry" (2016), awarded by the World Flower Council, which once again emphasizes the uniqueness of her works and the technologies used in their creation; 
 the certificate of honor for participation in the international exhibition of florist designers in St. Petersburg (2016), dedicated to the 300th anniversary of Peterhof and a diploma for the originality of the presented collection “Offering to a friend of Peterhof”; awards "Duty and Honor" and "Benefit, Honor and Glory" (2016) from the United Nations Council on Public Awards (UNCOPA).
 On August 1, 2018, in accordance with Order No. 376 of the President of the Republic of Azerbaijan, she was awarded the “Taraggi” (Progress) medal.
 On November 8, 2021, for the great services to world culture the United Nations Council on Public Awards (UNCOPA) awarded Sughra Baghirzada with the Leonardo da Vinci medal.

Filmography 
 "Roads and streets" ("Azerbaijanfilm", 1961).
 "Ulduz" ("Azerbaijanfilm", 1963).
 "A Man Is Born" ("Azerbaijanfilm", 1974)
 "Wonderful apples" ("Azerbaijanfilm", 1976).
 "Today, tomorrow and..." (Russia, 1977).
 "The lion left home" 2 series ("Azerbaijanfilm", 1977).
 "Trap" ("Azerbaijanfilm", 1993).
 "My chickens" (AzTV, 1995).
 "Dream" ("Azerbaijanfilm", 2001).
 “Execution is canceled” (“Azerbaijanfilm”, 2003).
 "The Last Witness" 4 series (AzTV, 2004).
 "Black Market" (Studio M&M, 2010).
 "Sharper than a sword." (dir.  A. Muradov, 2011).
 "13th department" (in association with the TV channel "Mir", 2014).
 “Life, how odd you are” (TV “Khazar”, 2015–16).
 "The Train Called Time". (dir.  K. Musayev, 2016)
 "Swing over the Caspian" (dir. G. Askerov, 2019)
 "Letter of Honor" (dir. R. Huseynov, 2021)

References 

1947 births
Recipients of the Tereggi Medal
Azerbaijani film actresses
Living people